was the fifty-second of the sixty-nine stations of the Nakasendō connecting Edo with Kyoto in Edo period Japan. It is located in former Mino Province in what is now part of the city of Kakamigahara, Gifu Prefecture, Japan.

History
Unuma was an important junction linking the routes that connected the provinces of Mino and Owari. It is of ancient origin, having been a stop on the old Tōsandō road, that predated the creation of the Nakasendō.  It was also the last post station on the Inagi Kaidō, which was a side road connecting Inuyama with what is now central Nagoya. The eastern and western portions of the old post town joined together to become a formal  post station  in 1651. During the Edo period, it was part of the territory of the Owari Domain, governed via Inuyama Castle, located on the opposite bank of the Kiso River, about two kilometers south. 

Unuma-juku is 396.0 kilometers from Edo and approximately six kilometers from the preceding post town, Ōta-juku.

Modern Unuma-juku has been preserved with restoration of several of its surviving old buildings, including the waki-honjin,  as well as several machiya, a sake brewery and other structures, and (unusually for Japanese towns), the electrical and telephone wires were buried underground. Restoration work was completed in 2013 and the area is now a popular tourist destination. The old post town contains such historical treasures as Kuan-ji Temple, the ancient tomb of Ishozuka, and haiku-engraved monuments left by Matsuo Bashō.

Unuma-juku in The Sixty-nine Stations of the Kiso Kaidō
Utagawa Hiroshige's ukiyo-e print of Unuma-juku dates from 1835 -1838. The print depicts a dramatic and rather stylized view of Inuyama Castle from the Owari side of the Kiso River. Travelers are crossing a wooden bridge over a moat, towards a ferry landing. The post station itself is barely visible in the far distance across a wide river.

Gallery

Neighboring Post Towns
Nakasendō
Ōta-juku - Unuma-juku - Kanō-juku
(Shinkanō-juku was an ai no shuku located between Unuma-juku and Kanō-juku.)

Inagi Kaidō
Unuma-juku - Inuyama-juku

References

External links

Hiroshige Kiso-Kaido series
Unuma-juku on Kiso Kaido Road
Gifu Nakasendo Guide

Notes

Stations of the Nakasendō
Post stations in Gifu Prefecture
Kakamigahara, Gifu
Mino Province